Florine is a rare name used in Christian communities like the Tulu Nadu Roman Catholics. It is both a surname and a feminine French given name. Notable people with the name include:

Surname:
 Hans Florine (born 1964), American rock climber
 Nicolas Florine (1891–1972), engineer that built the first tandem rotor helicopter

Given name:
Florine De Leymarie (born 1981), French Alpine skier
Florine of Burgundy (1083–1097), French crusader
Florine Stettheimer (1871–1944), American artist

See also 
 Sainte-Florine, a commune in the Haute-Loire department in south-central France
 Fluorine, a chemical element

French feminine given names